The Finswimming competition at the World Games 2017 took place from July 21 to July 22, in Wrocław in Poland, at the Orbita Indoor Swimming Pool. Overall 95 athletes from 19 countries participated.

Participating nations

 Belarus (2)
 Colombia (8)
 China (5)
 Chinese Taipei (1)
 Croatia (1)
 Czech Republic (2)
 Finland (1)
 France (5)
 Germany (4)
 Greece (6)
 Hungary (8)
 Italy (9)
 Japan (2)
 Ukraine (7)
 Poland (8)
 Russia (18)
 Spain (1)
 South Korea (6)
 Vietnam (1)

Medals table

Medals summary

Men

Women

References

External links
 Results book

2017 World Games
2017